Souvanna phoumai is a species of beetle in the family Cerambycidae, and the only species in the genus Souvanna. It was described by Breuning in 1963.

References

Apomecynini
Beetles described in 1963
Monotypic beetle genera